The 1959 Turkish Airlines Gatwick crash occurred on 17 February 1959, near London Gatwick Airport to a Turkish Airlines Vickers Viscount Type 793 (registration TC-SEV) on an international charter flight from Esenboğa International Airport in Ankara, Turkey, to London Heathrow Airport, however the Viscount diverted to London Gatwick Airport, United Kingdom due to heavy fog. It was carrying the Turkish prime minister and a party of government officials. The Viscount crashed in a wood 3 miles (4.8 km) from the threshold of Gatwick runway during its final approach to land in extensive fog. Five of the eight crew and nine of the 16 passengers died in the crash. The prime minister was among the ten survivors.

Flight
Turkish Prime Minister Adnan Menderes, accompanied by a Turkish delegation, was on his way to the British capital to sign the London Agreement on the Cyprus issue with British Prime Minister Harold Macmillan and Greek Prime Minister Constantine Karamanlis, which gave the three sides the right to intervene in Cyprus in case peace was broken by any of the parties.

The special flight departed from Ankara Esenboğa International Airport bound for London Heathrow Airport via Istanbul Atatürk International Airport  and Rome Ciampino Airport . The aircraft left its last stopover, Rome, at 13:02 hrs and called London Airways at 15:56 hrs over Abbeville, just before leaving French airspace. TC-SEV was cleared by air traffic control to the Epsom Radio Range station, the holding fix for London Airport. Over Epsom range at 16:21 hrs, the Turkish Airlines captain was instructed by the London Airport Commandant to divert to Gatwick due to poor visibility at Heathrow.

Accident
The airport's approach control informed the pilot that it would be positioned by radar for an ILS approach to the easterly Runway 09.

The weather reported to the aircraft was "surface wind calm, visibility one decimal one nautical miles, mist, three oktas at eight hundred feet, the QFE one zero three six", which was acknowledged by the pilot.

Turned on to the ILS approach path, TC-SEV overshot the centre line slightly. At  from touchdown, the aircraft affirmed that it could continue on the ILS. At 16:38 hrs, the captain was requested a change to tower frequency and this was acknowledged. It was the last communication with the aircraft.

It was assumed that the aircraft had crashed since no reply was received to radio calls to the aircraft.

The aircraft had flown into the top of trees  AMSL at the edge of Jordan's Wood east of the Newdigate-Rusper road on a heading parallel to the approach path to Runway 09 at Gatwick. The aircraft lost its wings and had its engines torn off as it descended at an angle of about 6 degrees from the horizontal  through the woods, and touched the ground with its wheels. After rising again slightly the main part of the wreckage landed upside down with trees embedded in the mangled fuselage about  further on, after which it caught fire. The rear part of the fuselage came to rest upside down and remained untouched by fire. Shortly after, an explosion occurred in the main fuselage.

This was the first air disaster in which Turkish Airlines was involved.

Rescue operations
Gatwick Airport alerted the local fire and rescue services, and soon it was confirmed that the aircraft had crashed in the area in which it had disappeared from the radar screen.

Peter Weller, a gardener at the Newdigate Chaffold farm, and his two colleagues noticed the crash. He asked one of his friends to ride on a bike to the next police station to report the accident. He and his other friend rushed to the scene and tried to rescue the victims. Shortly after 17:00 hrs another local resident, Margaret Bailey, who was a trained nurse, and her husband Tony were at the crash site.

The resulting fire was put out by three divisions of Surrey Fire Brigade, despite thick fog.

Turkish prime minister's survival

The survivors were screaming as they tried to leave the wreckage. Turkish Premier Adnan Menderes, who was seated at a left window seat in the rear passenger cabin, survived the crash with only light scratches to his face, hanging in an upside-down position with his foot stuck in the floor. He was helped by Rıfat Kadıoğlu, who freed his foot and unbuckled his safety belt. He was then taken out of the wreckage by Kadıoğlu and Şefik Fenmen. Another survivor, Melih Esenbel, joined the group outside. Menderes sat in shock witnessing his company burn.

Menderes was transferred to The London Clinic 90 minutes later. He signed the London Agreement on 19 February 1959, in the hospital. He returned home on 26 February 1959, and was welcomed by his archrival İsmet İnönü and a huge crowd.

Other casualties were treated at hospitals in East Grinstead, Redhill and Dorking. The bodies of the victims were transferred to Turkey and buried on 22 February 1959. A memorial to the victims is located in the Turkish Airforce plot at Brookwood Cemetery in Surrey.

Crash investigation
The following facts were ascertained:

The investigation concluded that:

From the eastern edge of the fog belt to Gatwick, there was mist and haze with visibility - and little or no low cloud.

Aircraft

The aircraft, a Vickers Viscount Type 793 with four Rolls-Royce Dart 510 turboprop engines, was built by Vickers-Armstrongs (Aircraft) Ltd and completed in 1958 with serial number 429.

A United Kingdom Certificate of Airworthiness was issued on 25 July 1958, valid for one year, and a Certificate of Validation for the same period was issued by the Civil Aviation Department of the Turkish Ministry of Communications. The aircraft was registered in the name of Turkish Airlines Incorporated.

The airframe had a total flight time of 548 hours and the engines had each run approximately 615 hours since manufacture. The Turkish authorities certified after examining the appropriate records and log books in Turkey that the maintenance had been properly carried out. Examination of the translated extracts from these documents showed no record of any defect, which might have affected the accident. It was noted that no inspections of the ILS equipment in the aircraft had been carried out.

At the time of the accident, the weight of the aircraft was below the permissible maximum for landing. It was not possible to check the trim but there was no reason to believe that it was not within the prescribed limits.

Crew and passengers
The eight crew consisted of three pilots, one navigator, one mechanic and three flight attendants, of whom five lost their lives.
 Münir Ozbek, Captain (38) – (in command) – killed
 Lütfi Biberoglu, Captain (35) – (second pilot) – killed
 Sabri Kazmaoglu, Captain (35) – (reserve pilot) – killed
 Gündüz Tezel, Captain (42) – (navigator) – killed
 Türkay Erkay – (steward) – seriously injured
 Gönül Uygur – (stewardess) – killed
 Yurdanur Yelkovan – (stewardess) – seriously injured
 Kemal Itık – (supernumerary mechanic) – uninjured

There were officially sixteen passengers on board, of which nine died at the accident. However, the list of names that appeared in the news included a total of seventeen passengers.
 Adnan Menderes (Prime minister) – uninjured
 Server Somuncuoğlu (Press, Media and Tourism Minister) – killed
 Muzaffer Ersü (Private secretary of Prime minister) – killed
 Şefik Fenmen (Deputy private secretary of Prime minister) – light injured
 Melih Esenbel (Secretary General of Foreign Ministry) – light injured
 İlhan Savut (Head of 2nd Department of Foreign Ministry) – killed
 Mehmet Ali Görmüş (Private secretary of Press, Media and Tourism Minister) – killed
 Sedat Görmüş (Secretary of Foreign Minister) – killed
 Güner Türkmen (Secretary of Foreign Minister) – killed
 Arif Demirer (Deputy of Afyonkarahisar Province) – injured
 Emin Kalafat (Deputy of Çanakkale Province) – injured
 Kemal Zeytinoğlu (Deputy of Eskişehir Province, former Public Works Minister) – killed
 Rıfat Kadıoğlu (Deputy of Sakarya Province) – injured
 Abdullah Parla (general manager of Turkish Airlines) – killed
 Şerif Arzık (general manager of Anadolu News Agency) – killed
 Burhan Tan (Photo reporter of Newspaper Akşam) – killed
 Kazım Nefes (Police bodyguard) – injured

TC-SEV replica
Turkish Airlines restored a Viscount 794D, manufacturer serial number 430, registration TC-SEL, which served as a VIP aircraft for the Turkish Air Force before being withdrawn from use in 1990. After changing the call sign to TC-SEV and repainting the livery to the original red-and-white striped pajamas design, the airframe was put on display in the Military Aviation Museum in Yeşilköy, Istanbul.

Film and television
The air crash in Gatwick was the subject for a documentary television film featuring the replica Viscount 794D.

A historical and romantic television series titled Hatırla Sevgili (Remember Darling) on the Turkish ATV channel also depicts the events around the accident and the survival of Menderes, again featuring the replica aircraft.

References

External links
Plane crash info

Aviation accidents and incidents in 1959
Aviation accidents and incidents in England
1959 disasters in the United Kingdom
1959 in England
1959 in Turkey
February 1959 events in the United Kingdom
Turkish Airlines accidents and incidents
Airliner accidents and incidents involving controlled flight into terrain
Airliner accidents and incidents involving fog
Accidents and incidents involving the Vickers Viscount
Aviation accidents and incidents involving state leaders
Disasters in Surrey
Gatwick Airport